Svetlana Yuryevna Zhurova-Boyko; born 8 February 1966) is a Soviet speed skater. She competed at the 1988 Winter Olympics and the 1992 Winter Olympics.

References

External links
 

1966 births
Living people
Soviet female speed skaters
Olympic speed skaters of the Soviet Union
Olympic speed skaters of the Unified Team
Speed skaters at the 1988 Winter Olympics
Speed skaters at the 1992 Winter Olympics
Place of birth missing (living people)